Andrea Cagnano (born 17 June 1998), is an Italian professional footballer who plays as a left back for Como.

Club career

Internazionale 
Born in Cantù, Cagnano was a youth exponent of Inter.

Loan to Santarcangelo and Pisa 
On 19 July 2017, Canano with Riccardo Gaiola were signed by Serie C side Santarcangelo on a season-long loan deal. On 3 September he made his professional debut in a 2–1 away win over Gubbio, he played the entire match. On 26 November, Cagnano scored his first professional goal, as a substitute, in the 74th minute of a 2–1 home defeat against FeralpiSalò. In January 2018, Cagnano returned to Inter leaving Santarcangelo with 13 appearances and 1 goal.

On 31 January 2018, Cagnano was loaned to Serie C club Pisa for the second part of the season. On 20 March he made his debut for Pisa as a substitute replacing Maikol Negro in the 90th minute of a 1–0 away win over Pistoiese. Four days later, on 24 March, Cagnano played his first match as a starter in a 2–0 home defeat against Carrarese, and four more days later he played his first entire match for Pisa, a 1–0 away defeat against Arezzo. Cagnano ended his 6-month loan to Pisa with only this 3 appearances.

Loan to Pistoiese 
On 5 July 2018, Cagnano was loaned to Serie C club Pistoiese on a season-long loan deal. On 29 July he made his debut for Pistoiese in a 1–0 away defeat against Juve Stabia in the first round of Coppa Italia, he was replaced by Francesco Cerretelli in the 84th minute. On 16 September he made his Serie C debut for Pistoiese in a 2–1 away defeat against Pro Patria, he was replaced by Emmanuel Latte Lath in the 69th minute. One week later, on 26 September, he played his first entire match for Pistoiese, a 3–3 away draw against Pro Piacenza. On 16 March 2019, Cagnano was sent-off with a red card in the 91st minute of a 1–0 away defeat against Piacenza. Cagnano ended his season-long loan to Pistoiese with 36 appearances and 2 assists.

Novara 
On 19 July 2019, Cagnano signed for Serie C club Novara on an undisclosed fee and a 3-year contract. On 26 August he made his debut for the club in a 2–0 home win over Juventus U23, he played the entire match. He became Novara's first-choice early in the season, he was replaced for the first time by Pablo Gonzàles in the 87th minute of his ninth appearance in a 2–1 away defeat against Giana Erminio. On 19 January 2020, Cagnano scored his first goal for the club in the 28th minute of a 3–2 away defeat against Lecco. In his first season at Novara he also helps the club to reach the play-off, but Novara lose 2–1 against Reggio Audace in the semi-finals. On 21 October he scored his second goal for the club in the 46th minute of a 3–2 away win over Livorno.

Como 
On 17 August 2021, he signed a two-year contract with Como.

Career statistics

Club

Honours

Club 
Inter Primavera

 Campionato Nazionale Primavera: 2016–17

References

External links

1998 births
Living people
Italian footballers
Association football defenders
Santarcangelo Calcio players
Inter Milan players
Pisa S.C. players
U.S. Pistoiese 1921 players
Novara F.C. players
Como 1907 players
Serie B players
Serie C players